Juan Hilario Marrero Pérez, known as Hilario, (8 December 1905 – 14 February 1989) was a Spanish association footballer. He earned 2 caps and scored 1 goal for the Spain national football team, and participated in the 1934 FIFA World Cup.

International goals

External links
 
 
 National team data at BDFutbol
 

1905 births
1989 deaths
Footballers from Las Palmas
Spanish footballers
Association football midfielders
La Liga players
Segunda División players
Deportivo de La Coruña players
Real Madrid CF players
Valencia CF players
FC Barcelona players
Elche CF players
Spain international footballers
1934 FIFA World Cup players
Spanish football managers
La Liga managers
Segunda División managers
Deportivo de La Coruña managers
Elche CF managers
Racing de Ferrol managers
Girona FC managers